Nicholas Prea is a speaker of the National Assembly of Seychelles.  An engineer by profession, he is a member of the Seychelles National Party.

Prea was first elected to the Assembly in 2002. He was elected as the Speaker of the National Assembly in March 2018 and served until 29 October 2020.
Prea was secretary general of the Seychelles National Party until his resignation on 17 February 2020.

References

Year of birth missing (living people)
Living people
Speakers of the National Assembly (Seychelles)
People from Bel Ombre, Seychelles
Seychelles National Party politicians